Dioxane may also refer to:
 1,2-dioxane 
 1,3-dioxane
 1,4-dioxane